The 2022 Gulf 12 Hours was the 11th edition of the Gulf 12 Hours, and was held at Yas Marina Circuit on 8 January 2022. The race was contested with GT3-spec cars and GT4-spec cars.

Teams and drivers

Results

Qualifying
Fastest in class in bold.

Results after 6 hours
Class winners denoted in bold.

Final results
Class winners denoted in bold.

References

External links 
 

Gulf
Gulf
Gulf 12 Hours